Shabnam Asthana is an Indian public relations expert, speaker, and entrepreneur. In 2012, she received the National Public Relations Hall of Fame award by PRCI from H. K. Dua for her contributions in the public relations field.

Early life and education
Asthana was born in Bokaro Steel City. She earned a bachelor's degree in arts from Lady Shri Ram College in 1983 and later, she earned a master's degree in arts and also studied at Symbiosis to complete a post graduate diploma in Public Relations and Advertising. She also completed a postgraduate program in marketing management from Symbiosis, Pune.

Career
Asthana taught English for more than 2 years at the National Defence Academy, Khadakwasla. After leaving NDA, she worked at a few private companies and also as a freelance journalist and writer for leading newspapers and magazines. She also served as a panelist and guest faculty for Institutes and Business Schools including Symbiosis, Indira, IIBM, Sinhagad, Matrix, NIILM, D.Y Patil and others.

2005-present
In 2005, Asthana founded Empowered Solutions. In addition to coordinating and synchronizing the functions of businesses, the company also handles public relations and draws out marketing and sales strategies for them. Her clientage includes IND TV USA, Garware Wall Ropes, Reiter, Phoenix Mecano, Premium, The Little Gym, Soukos Robots S.A, SIMC, Clover Builders, University of Pune, Funskool, NTT data and others.

In May 2017, her book, Romancing Your Career was launched by Lila Poonawalla. The book is about work experiences in the corporate world and was covered by Business Standard, DNA News, Hindustan Times, Education Times and other major media.

Asthana is often seen at conferences for entrepreneurship, public relations and women upliftment including National Summit on Startups and Women Entrepreneurship, Eurasian Economic Congress, Indian  Russian Dialogue and Ahmadiya Muslim Community Conference. As of June 2020, she also writes on the Thrive Global platform.

Accolades
She received the Hall of Fame award at Mumbai from The PRCI for her contributions in the public relations industry in 2012. Asthana was the first Indian to be invited at 2012 PRSSA 2012 National Conference in San Francisco. She received the Times Power Women 2017 award for Global PR from The Times Group in January 2018.

In September 2018, she received Times Power Woman 2018 award from The Times of India Group. Next month, Asthana received the Mahatma Gandhi Samman at the House of Commons in London and 2018 Pune Best Brand Awards. In April 2019, Asthana was conferred an honorary doctorate by National American University.

References

External links
 Official website

Indian public relations people
Businesswomen from Jharkhand
Lady Shri Ram College alumni
People from Bokaro Steel City
Businesspeople from Jharkhand
Living people
20th-century Indian businesswomen
20th-century Indian businesspeople
Indian women business executives
Year of birth missing (living people)